Golden Bay / Mohua is a shallow, paraboloid-shaped bay in New Zealand, near the northern tip of the South Island.  An arm of the Tasman Sea, the bay lies northwest of Tasman Bay / Te Tai-o-Aorere and Cook Strait.  It is protected in the north by Farewell Spit, a 26 km long arm of fine golden sand that is the country's longest sandspit.  The Aorere and Tākaka rivers are the major waterways to flow into the bay from the south and the west.

It is part of the Tasman Region, one of the territorial authorities of New Zealand.

The bay was once a resting area for migrating whales and dolphins such as southern right whales and humpback whales, and pygmy blue whales may be observed off the bay as well.

The west and northern regions of the bay are largely unpopulated.  Along its southern coast are the towns of Tākaka and Collingwood, and the Abel Tasman National Park.  Separation Point, the natural boundary between Golden and Tasman Bays, is in the park. North-eastern parts of Kahurangi National Park are in Golden Bay.

It is known for being a popular tourist destination, because of its good weather and relaxed, friendly lifestyle. Beaches such as Tata Beach are popular locations for retirees and holiday homes.

Name

The official name is Golden Bay / Mohua.

Māori called the area Mohua, potentially after the bird.
In 1642, Abel Tasman named the bay Moordenaarsbaai, meaning "Killers' Bay" or "Murderers' Bay", after four of his crew were killed there in a clash with Maori. In 1770, Cook included it as part of Tasman Bay, which he called "Blind Bay". 50 years later, Dumont d'Urville named it Massacre Bay, but following the discovery of coal in Takaka in 1842 it was renamed Coal Bay. In 1857, gold was found near inland from Parapara, prompting another change, this time to Golden Bay.

History

Māori lived along the shores of Golden Bay from at least 1450, which is the earliest dated archaeological evidence (from carbon dating) yet found. In 2010 an extensive scientific study was made of Golden Bay by a team from Otago University led by Associate Professor Ian Barber. They accurately plotted and investigated a large number of early Māori sites ranging from pā to kāinga to probable kumara gardens that stretch along the coastal arc from the base of Farewell Spit at Triangle Flat, 60 km eastwards to a pā site 10 km east of Separation Point. Some of the original inhabitants of the area were Waitaha, Ngāi Tara and Ngāti Wairangi (Hauāuru Māori from Whanganui), who were displaced by Ngāti Tūmatakōkiri in the early 1600s.

Dutch explorer Abel Tasman anchored in this bay in 1642. Ngāti Tūmatakōkiri rammed the Dutch ship's cockboat with a waka and four Dutch seamen were killed by Māori, prompting Tasman to name it Moordenaar's Bay (Murderers Bay). Archeological research has shown the Dutch had tried to land at a major agricultural area, which the Māori may have been trying to protect. Tasman saw at least 22 waka. He recorded that of the 11 waka that chased his ship, most had 17 men on board. This gives a total of about 200 men, with a likely population of about 500 people. Tasman had already been in the bay five days when attacked giving the Māori time to assemble an attack force. Archaeological evidence has not shown any large settlements so it is likely that the iwi normally lived in whanau based groups scattered along the coast but mainly in the eastern bay at Ligar Beach, Tata Beach and Wainui Bay where there are 20 known archaeological sites in a 10 km zone.

In 1770, during his first voyage, English explorer James Cook included the bay as part of Blind Bay, but upon his second voyage to the bay in 1773 realised that it was in fact the location of Murderers Bay. The French explorer Jules Dumont d'Urville appears to have changed the name to Massacre Bay.

After Ngāti Tūmatakōkiri's defeat in the 1810s, Golden Bay became a part of the rohe of Ngāti Apa ki te Rā Tō.

European settlement commenced in October 1842 with the Lovell family settling at Motupipi near the then existing Māori pā site. Earlier, in March of that year, Frederick Tuckett had discovered coal on the beach near the Motupipi pā. There was a report from May 1841, which also stated there was coal in the area. In the 1840s, following the discoveries, the local population unsuccessfully sought to have it renamed Coal Bay.

In 1846, Charles Heaphy and Thomas Brunner with their Māori guide Kehu, passed through Golden Bay on their journey to the West Coast. In 1850, Packard, Robinson and Lovell started the first sawmill in Tākaka and between 1852 and 1856 land was sold to various European immigrants in Golden Bay by some members of the local iwi but without the consent of the entire iwi. In 1855 William Gibbs bought 50 acres of land from local Māori and established the town of Gibbstown which later was renamed Collingwood.

In the late 1850s, with the discovery of gold at Aorere, its name was changed to Golden Bay. In the Great Depression, miners returned to search for any remaining gold in a government-subsidised prospecting scheme for the unemployed, and about 40 miners lived in a dozen huts around Waingaro Forks.

The road over Tākaka Hill was completed in 1888. Prior to this, the usual method of access to Golden Bay was by sea.

A coal mining lease was granted to Joseph Taylor and James Walker in 1895 to a piece of land at Pūponga on the coast between Farewell Spit and Collingwood. They subsequently discovered a seam of coal that was between three and seven feet in depth. Work on developing a mine progressed with a tramline built and a wharf built, and dredging took place to allow ships to berth and be loaded with coal. By 1910, 73 men were employed at the mine and over 30,000 tons of coal had been mined. The mine was run by various companies until 1974 when it became uneconomic.

Deposits of limonite and coal lead to the development of an iron works at Onekaka. The Onekaka ironworks started operating in 1924. A hydroelectric scheme was built to power the ironworks and a wharf and tramway were built to move supplies and product in and out of the factory. The ironworks fell victim to the great depression, a saturated local market for iron and Australian tariffs limiting the export potential. The iron works closed in 1935. The iron works were nationalised but the grand plans to revitalise the iron works never succeeded and it was finally closed for good in 1954.

The Abel Tasman National Park was established on 16 December 1942 which was 300 years exactly after Abel Tasman had visited Golden Bay. It was established thanks to the determined efforts of Pérrine Moncrieff, who was concerned about both a proposal to mill the trees around Totaranui in 1937 and a plan to build a road through the area. Home to beech forests, red tussock, penguin colonies, wading birds and seals, the park has rich ecological systems.

During the 1960s and the early 1970s, the Ministry of Works surveyed the land where the Heaphy Track now exists for a proposed road to link Golden Bay with the Karamea. This was encouraged by local authorities both in Golden Bay and on the West Coast. The project never progressed beyond this due to public opposition and a lack of funding from the government.

The Northwest Nelson Forest Park was created in 1970 by amalgamating eight state forest parks. The Tasman Wilderness area was established in 1988 and this entire area was given the highest level of conservation protection in 1996 when it became the Kahurangi National Park. It is the second largest of New Zealand's national park and forms the majority of Golden Bay's interior. The primary reason for its establishment was a new emphasis on protecting the rich biodiversity of the park. It has the largest number of endemic plants of any national park. The park includes the great spotted kiwi, wētās, 29 species of carnivorous snails and native cave spiders.

In 1974, the Milnethorpe Park regeneration project was started. Four hundred  acres of land overlooking the beach which had very poor soils was chosen for the project. Native species would not grow on the land initially. A variety of Australian gum trees and acacias were planted. As they grew and the soil conditions improved, natives were established amongst them. By 2020, the park had a forest like appearance with many kilometres of walking tracks built.

In December 2011 Golden Bay, as well as much of the Nelson and Tasman regions, were hit by heavy rain and flooding. It was described as a 1 in 500 year downpour for Tākaka. This affected many homes around the Pohara, Ligar Bay, Tata Beach and Wainui area. State Highway 60 between Tākaka and Collingwood was severely damaged at Bird's Hill. The road to Totaranui, a popular isolated tourist destination in Tasman Bay, was badly damaged and was reopened on 29 June 2012.

In August 2014, the name of the bay was officially altered to Golden Bay / Mohua.

Ex Cyclone Gita hit Golden Bay in February 2018 and damaged state highway 60 over the Tākaka Hill isolating Golden Bay from the rest of the South Island. The road over Tākaka Hill was closed by 16 landslides. Tākaka lost electricity and roads and bridges were damaged making them unusable. Barges were required to bring in food supplies and keep the Fonterra dairy factory in operation in Tākaka. It took a number of days for the NZ Transport Agency to reopen the road over Tākaka Hill to essential vehicles and those most urgently needing to leave the region. The road has taken substantial work and time to repair and was fully repaired by the end of 2021.

Demographics 
Golden Bay/Mohua statistical area includes Collingwood and Parapara.

Golden Bay/Mohua had a population of 2,421 at the 2018 New Zealand census, an increase of 111 people (4.8%) since the 2013 census, and an increase of 165 people (7.3%) since the 2006 census. There were 975 households. There were 1,233 males and 1,188 females, giving a sex ratio of 1.04 males per female. The median age was 49 years (compared with 37.4 years nationally), with 426 people (17.6%) aged under 15 years, 276 (11.4%) aged 15 to 29, 1,191 (49.2%) aged 30 to 64, and 531 (21.9%) aged 65 or older.

Ethnicities were 95.4% European/Pākehā, 7.1% Māori, 0.7% Pacific peoples, 2.1% Asian, and 2.0% other ethnicities (totals add to more than 100% since people could identify with multiple ethnicities).

The proportion of people born overseas was 23.0%, compared with 27.1% nationally.

Although some people objected to giving their religion, 67.7% had no religion, 20.6% were Christian, 0.2% were Hindu, 0.1% were Muslim, 0.6% were Buddhist and 2.6% had other religions.

Of those at least 15 years old, 456 (22.9%) people had a bachelor or higher degree, and 303 (15.2%) people had no formal qualifications. The median income was $25,500, compared with $31,800 nationally. The employment status of those at least 15 was that 813 (40.8%) people were employed full-time, 477 (23.9%) were part-time, and 33 (1.7%) were unemployed.

Over the summer months, the population of Golden Bay increases significantly with holiday makers taking holidays near the Golden Bay beaches. Numbers of people staying in Golden Bay have been reported as swelling the population up to 25.000 people during the peak holiday season.

Hydroelectricity 

The Cobb Valley is the location of the Cobb Hydroelectric Power Station. The reservoir sits at 794 metres above sea level at the confluence of the Tākaka and Cobb rivers, The power station is situated 600 vertical metres below and provides  32 MW of power. The average annual output is 192 GWh. It was built between 1936 and 1956. Construction was difficult due to the weather with an annual rainfall of over 2,200mm and snow and heavy frosts in winter. The dam was originally planned to be concrete but this was deemed to be not suitable and an earth dam was constructed instead. It first produced power in 1944.

Asbestos mining 
Asbestos was discovered in Golden Bay in 1882 in the mountains behind Takaka. Several attempts were made to obtain commercial quantities in 1896 and 1908 but miners struggled with the isolated mountainous location. In 1917, 100 tons of asbestos was brought down by packhorse. With the development of the Cobb Valley hydroelectricity scheme, and in particular, the access road, asbestos mining became viable. Forty tons were extracted each month until the mine closed in 1945. The mine reopened in 1949 with government assistance and mining continued until 1964.

Golden Bay Cement 
The components of Portland cement were found to be all available in Golden Bay and in the early 1880s a cement works was built near Collingwood but was never completed due to a lack of financing. In 1909 a cement works plant was built at Tarakohe where there was plenty of suitable limestone to quarry close to a safe anchorage. The end product was then shipped to the North Island where plenty of demand existed. A wharf was built in 1910 and then a few years later a road was built from the cement works round the bays to Pōhara. By 1928, 50,000 tons of cement was produced annually. To provide bulk shipment of cement by sea, the ship MV Golden Bay was acquired in 1955. In 1988, the new owners (Fletcher Challenge) closed the cement works and transferred the name Golden Bay Cement to their other plant in Whangarei. In 1994, the harbour facilities owned by the cement works were sold to the Tasman District Council.

Farming

Dairy farming 
In 2009, there were 83 dairy farms which supplied the Fonterra factory in Tākaka. The factory turned about 525,000 litres of milk  each day into skim milk powder.

References

Bays of the Tasman District
Maritime history of the Dutch East India Company